The 24th Sony Radio Academy Awards were held on 8 May 2006 at the Grosvenor House Hotel, Park Lane in London.
There were 29 categories of award and two special awards.

Programme awards and winners
The Breakfast Show Award — Nick Ferrari at Breakfast (LBC 97.3FM)
The Music Programme Award — Mornings with Rick Shaw (Kerrang! 105.2 West Midlands)
The Specialist Music Programme Award — Zane Lowe (BBC Radio 1)
The News and Current Affairs Programme Award — 1800 News Bulletin (BBC Radio 4)
The Sports Programme Award — Fighting Talk (BBC Radio Five Live)
The Speech Programme Award — The Stephen Nolan Show (BBC Radio Ulster)
The Interactive Programme Award — Scott Mills (BBC Radio 1)
The Entertainment Award — Chris Moyles (BBC Radio 1)

Personality awards and winners
The Music Broadcaster of the Year — Zane Lowe (BBC Radio 1)
The Music Radio Personality of the Year — Chris Evans (BBC Radio 2)
The News Journalist of the Year — Angus Stickler (BBC Radio 4)
The Speech Broadcaster of the Year — Eddie Mair (BBC Radio 4)
The Station Programmer of the Year — Richard Park (Magic 105.4)

Production awards and winners
The Drama Award — No Background Music (BBC Radio 4)
The Comedy Award — The Ape That Got Lucky (BBC Radio 4)
The Feature Award — A Requiem for St Kilda (BBC Radio 4)
The Musical Special Award — Lennon: The Wenner Tapes (BBC Radio 4)
The News Feature Award — Return to Sarajevo (BBC World Service)
The Breaking News Award — The London Bombings (Capital Radio)
The Live Event Coverage Award — The Boat Race 2005 (LBC)
The Community Award — Hearing Voices (BBC Hereford & Worcester)
The Promo Award — Kerrang! Christmas (Kerrang! 105.2 West Midlands)
The Competition Award — Xfm’s Rock School (Xfm)
The Station Imaging Award — Kerrang! 105.2 West Midlands

Station awards and winners
Station of the Year with a potential audience of under 300,000 — Coast 96.3 (North Wales Coast)
Station of the Year with a potential audience of 300,000 – 1 million — Pirate FM (Cornwall, Plymouth & West Devon)
Station of the Year with a potential audience of 1 million plus — Kerrang! 105.2 West Midlands
Digital Terrestrial Station of the Year — Planet Rock
UK Station of the Year — BBC Radio 1

Special awards
The Special Award — The Beethoven Experience
The Gold Award — Terry Wogan

References

External links
The Sony Radio Academy Awards

Sony Radio Academy Awards
Sony Radio Academy Awards
Radio Academy Awards